Role Aids is a line of role-playing game supplements published by Mayfair Games starting in 1982 intended for use with Advanced Dungeons & Dragons.

Publication history
As a veteran role-playing gamer, Bill Fawcett decided to get Mayfair Games into the RPG field, and the company kicked off its Role Aids game line with Beastmaker Mountain (1982). Darwin Bromley was involved with the Chicago Wargaming Association's convention, CWAcon, where Mayfair's first fantasy adventures in their new Role Aids game line were run: Beastmaker Mountain, Nanorien Stones (1982) and Fez I (1982). With Bromley's legal expertise, he felt that Mayfair could legally use TSR's trademarks as long as they were careful, so beginning with their Dwarves (1982) supplement Mayfair made it clear that they were not the trademark holders by printing on the cover: "Advanced Dungeons & Dragons is a trademark of TSR Hobbies, Inc. Use of the trademark NOT sanctioned by the holder."

Gary Gygax had advocated arranging a licensing agreement between TSR, Inc. and Mayfair Games for their Role Aids line of game supplements, but was outvoted in the board meeting considering the question.

In the early 1990s, Ray Winninger resurrected the Role Aids line, determined to recreate it with AD&D material that was more sophisticated than what TSR was offering at the time.

In 1993, Mayfair was sued by TSR, who argued that Role Aids—advertised as compatible with Advanced Dungeons & Dragons—violated their 1984 trademark agreement. While the court found that some of the line violated their trademark, the line as a whole did not violate the agreement, and Mayfair continued publishing the line until the rights were bought by TSR.

Publications
Archmagic
Beastmaker Mountain
Beneath Two Suns
Blasted Land
Clockwork Mage
Crystal Barrier
Dark Folk
Deadly Power
Dragons
Dragons of Weng T'sen
Dwarves
Elven Banner
Elves
Evil Ruins
Fantastic Treasures
Fantastic Treasures II
Fez I: Valley of Trees
Fez I: Wizard's Vale
Fez II: The Contract
Fez III: Angry Wizard
Fez IV: Wizard's Revenge
Fez V: Wizard's Betrayal
Fez VI: Wizard's Dilemma
Final Challenge
Giants
Ice Elves
The Keep
Kobold Hall
Lich Lords
Monsters of Myth & Legend
Monsters of Myth and Legend II
Nanorien Stones
Pinnacle
Question of Gravity
Shadows of Evil
Shipwrecker
Swordthrust
Throne of Evil
Tower of Magicks
Undead
War of Darkness
Witches
Wizards

Reception
Kelly Grimes and Aaron Allston reviewed the first four products in the Role Aids line, Beastmaker Mountain, Nanorien Stones, Fez I, and Dwarves, and the Role Aids line as a whole in The Space Gamer #58.  They commented that "most of the titles are characterized by a great deal of thought, attention to detail, and usefulness, and can indeed provide relief to the harried gamemaster." They noted that "all four are characterized by good printing quality and typesetting, adequate-to-good layout and formatting, average maps, and mediocre art; the folders for the adventures seem sturdy enough and are an innovative touch."  They concluded the review by saying: "For the most part, the RoleAids are worth the asking price.  Most of the modules share some minor problems.  It seems as though each designer decided at some point, 'This is where my contract says I ought to get silly.'  Silliness is not inherently wrong for FRPGs – but here it occasionally serves to break a mood that the designers (and DM) might had worked too hard to set."

Rick Swan commented on the line in The Space Gamer No. 72: "Gamers new to Dungeons & Dragons are often surprised to discover that TSR isn't the only company producing suitable roleplaying material.  Mayfair is among the best of them, and their RoleAids series is certainly worth checking out by any Dungeons & Dragons fan.  Unlike so many so-called 'universal' roleplaying modules, which can require extensive reworking before they're in a playable format, RoleAids modules have been designed with D&D specifically in mind."

References

 
Fantasy role-playing game supplements
Mayfair Games games